Korean reunification is the potential unification of the Democratic People's Republic of Korea and the Republic of Korea into a single Korean sovereign state. The process towards reunification was started by the June 15th North–South Joint Declaration in June 2000, and was reaffirmed by the Panmunjom Declaration for Peace, Prosperity and Unification of the Korean Peninsula in April 2018, and the joint statement of U.S. President Donald Trump and the Democratic People's Republic of Korean Supreme Leader Kim Jong-un at the Singapore Summit in June 2018. In the Panmunjom Declaration, the two countries agreed to work towards a peaceful reunification of Korea in the future.

Prior to World War I and Japan's annexation of Korea (1910–1945), all of Korea had been unified as a single state for centuries, known previously as the Goryeo and Joseon dynasties, and the penultimate state, the Korean Empire. After the end of World War II in 1945 and during the beginning of the Cold War, Korea had a unified government, the People's Republic of Korea. However, this would be brief and serve as the last government, as Korea was divided into two countries along the 38th parallel (now the Korean Demilitarized Zone) in 1948. The Democratic People's Republic of Korea was administered by the Workers' Party of Korea in a coalition government in the years immediately following the war, with South Korea being occupied by the United States. In 1950, the Democratic People's Republic of Korea invaded the South after the South engaged in mass arrests of suspected Democratic People's Republic of Korea sympathizers, beginning the Korean War, which ended in stalemate in 1953. Even after the end of the Korean War, reunification proved a challenge as the two countries increasingly diverged at a steady pace. However, in the late 2010s, relations between North and South Korea warmed somewhat, beginning with the Democratic People's Republic of Korea's participation at the 2018 Winter Olympics in Pyeongchang County, Gangwon Province, South Korea. In 2019, South Korean president Moon Jae-in proposed reunification of the Korean peninsula by 2045.

Division (since 1945)

The current division of the Korean Peninsula is the result of decisions taken at the end of World War II. In 1910, the Empire of Japan annexed Korea and ruled over it until its defeat in World War II. The Korean independence agreement officially occurred on 1 December 1943, when the United States, China, and the United Kingdom signed the Cairo Declaration, which stated: "The aforesaid three powers, mindful of the enslavement of the people of Korea, are determined that in due course Korea shall become free and independent". In 1945, the United Nations developed plans for trusteeship administration of Korea.

The division of the peninsula into two military occupation zones was agreed: a northern zone, administered by the Soviet Union, and a southern zone, administered by the United States. At midnight on 10 August 1945, two army lieutenant colonels selected the 38th parallel as a dividing line. Japanese troops north of the line were to surrender to the Soviet Union, and the troops south of the line would surrender to the United States. 

The partition was not originally intended to last long, but Cold War politics resulted in the establishment of two separate governments in the two zones in 1948, and rising tensions prevented co-operation. The desire of many Koreans for a peaceful unification was dashed when the Korean War broke out in 1950. On 25 June 1950, troops from North Korea invaded South Korea. Mao Zedong encouraged the confrontation with the United States and Joseph Stalin reluctantly supported the invasion. After three years of fighting, which involved both Koreas, China and United Nations forces, the last of which were led by the US, the war ended with an armistice agreement at approximately the same boundary.

After Korean War (since 1953)

Bilateral agreements 
Despite being politically-separate entities after the Korean War, the governments of North and South Korea both proclaimed the eventual restoration of Korea as a single state as a goal.

North-South Joint Communiqué 
After the "Nixon Shock" in 1971 that led to détente between the United States and China, the North and South Korean governments made in 1972 the 7 · 4 South and North Korea Joint Statement, also known as the July 4 North-South Joint Statement or the Joint Announcement on July 4, 1972. It had a representative of each government secretly visit the other's capital city, and both sides agreed to a North-South Joint Communiqué, outlining the steps to be taken towards achieving a peaceful reunification of the country:
 Unification shall be achieved through independent Korean efforts without being subject to the external imposition of interference.
 Unification shall be achieved through peaceful means, and not through the use of force against each other.
 As a homogeneous people, a great national unity shall be sought above all, transcending differences in ideas, ideologies, and systems.
 In order to ease tensions, and foster an atmosphere of mutual trust between the South and the North, the two sides have agreed not to slander or defame each other, not to undertake armed provocations whether on a large or small scale and to take positive measures to prevent inadvertent military incidents.
 The two sides, in order to restore severed national ties, promote mutual understanding, and expedite independent peaceful unification, have agreed to carry out various exchanges in many fields such as culture and science.
 The two sides have agreed to cooperate positively with each other to seek early success of the North-South Red Cross talks, which are underway with the fervent expectations of the entire people.
 The two sides, in order to prevent the outbreak of unexpected military incidents and to deal directly, promptly, and accurately with problems arising between the North and the South, have agreed to install a direct telephone line between Seoul and Pyongyang.
 The two sides, in order to implement the aforementioned agreed-upon items, to solve various problems existing between the North and the South, and to settle the unification problem on the basis of the agreed-upon principles for the unification of the Fatherland, have agreed to establish and operate a North-South Coordinating Committee co-chaired by Director Yi Hurak [representing the South] and Director Kim Yong-ju [representing the North].
 The two sides, firmly convinced that the aforementioned agreed-upon items correspond with the common aspirations of the entire people, who are anxious to see an early unification of the Fatherland, hereby solemnly pledge before the entire Korean people that they will faithfully carry out these agreed-upon items."

The agreement outlined the steps to be taken towards achieving a peaceful reunification of the country. However, the North-South Coordination Committee was disbanded the following year after no progress had been made towards implementing the agreement. In January 1989, the founder of Hyundai, Jung Ju-young, toured North Korea and promoted tourism in Mount Kumgang. After a twelve-year hiatus, the prime ministers of the two Koreas met in Seoul in September 1990 to engage in the Inter-Korean summits or High-Level Talks. In December, the two countries reached an agreement on issues of reconciliation, nonaggression, cooperation, and exchange between North and South in "The Agreement on Reconciliation, Nonaggression, Cooperation, and Exchange Between North and South", but these talks collapsed over inspection of nuclear facilities. In 1994, after former U.S. President Jimmy Carter's visit to Pyongyang, the leaders of the two Koreas agreed to meet with each other, but the meeting was prevented by the death of Kim Il-sung that July.

June 15th North-South Joint Declaration 

In June 2000, North and South Korea signed the June 15th North-South Joint Declaration, in which both sides made promises to seek out a peaceful reunification:

 The North and the South agreed to solve the question of the country's reunification independently by the concerted efforts of the Korean nation responsible for it.
 The North and the South, recognizing that the low-level federation proposed by the North and the commonwealth system proposed by the South for the reunification of the country have similarity, agreed to work together for the reunification in this direction in the future.
 The North and the South agreed to settle humanitarian issues (such as the North Korean famine) as early as possible, including the exchange of visiting groups of separated families and relatives and the issue of unconverted long-term prisoners, to mark August 15 this year.
 The North and the South agreed to promote the balanced development of the national economy through economic cooperation and build mutual confidence by activating cooperation and exchange in all fields, social, cultural, sports, public health, environmental and so on.
 The North and the South agreed to hold an authority-to-authority negotiation as soon as possible to put the above-mentioned agreed points into speedy operation.

October 4th Declaration 
During the 2007 high-level inter-Korean talks held in Pyongyang between Kim Jong-Il and Roh Moo Hyun, both sides agreed to the October 4th Declaration, improving on inter-Korean relations on the basis of the June 15 Joint Declaration. The eight points of the declaration signed on the 4th of October 2007 are as follows:

 "The north and the south shall uphold and positively implement the June 15 Joint Declaration.
 "The north and the south agreed to convert north-south relations definitely into those of mutual respect and confidence, transcending the difference in ideology and system.
 "The north and the south agreed to closely cooperate with each other in the efforts to put an end to hostile military relations and ensure détente and peace on the Korean peninsula.
 "The north and the south, based on the common understanding of the need to put an end to the existing armistice mechanism and build a lasting peace mechanism, agreed to cooperate with each other in the efforts to push forward with the issue of arranging a meeting on the territory of the Korean peninsula of the heads of state of three or four parties directly concerned to promote the matter of declaring an end to war.
 "The north and the south agreed to reactivate economic cooperation and bring about its sustained development on the principles of ensuring common interests and prosperity and meeting each other’s needs with a view to balanced development of the national economy and common prosperity.
 "The north and the south agreed to develop exchanges and cooperation in social and cultural fields such as history, language, education, science and technology, culture and the arts, and sports to add brilliance to the time-honored history and fine culture of the nation.
 "The north and the south agreed to push forward humanitarian cooperation.
 "The north and the south agreed to strengthen cooperation on the international arena in the efforts to protect the interests of the nation and the rights and interests of overseas Koreans."

Panmunjom Declaration for Peace, Prosperity and Reunification of the Korean Peninsula 
In April 2018, at the north-south summit talks at the "House of Peace" in Panmunjom, Kim Jong-un and Moon Jae-in signed the Panmunjom Declaration for Peace, Prosperity and Reunification of the Korean Peninsula, declaring that there would be no longer war and a new era of peace has opened on the Korean peninsula. They declared as follows reflecting the firm will to put an end to division and confrontation, to open up a new era of national reconciliation, peace and prosperity and more actively improve and develop the north-south ties. A brief outline of the three main points of the agreement are as follows:

 "The north and the south will achieve comprehensive and epochal improvement and development in the north-south ties and thus relink the severed blood vessel of the nation and bring earlier the future of common prosperity and independent reunification.
 "The north and the south will make joint efforts to defuse the acute military tensions and to substantially defuse the danger of a war on the Korean peninsula.
 "The north and the south will closely cooperate with each other to build a durable and lasting peace mechanism on the Korean peninsula."

September Pyongyang Joint Declaration 
In September 2018 during the Pyongyang summit of the two leaders, under the implementation of the Panmunjom declaration, the September Pyongyang Joint Declaration was signed. The six main points of the declaration are as follows:

 "The north and the south committed to lead the termination of military hostility in the confrontation area including the Demilitarized Zone to the fundamental removal of the substantial danger of war and hostility in the whole of the Korean peninsula.
 "The north and the south agreed to take practical measures to further increase exchanges and cooperation and to develop the nation's economy in a balanced way on the principle of mutual benefits and common interests and prosperity.
 "The north and the south agreed to further strengthen humanitarian cooperation for the fundamental settlement of the issue of separated families and relatives in the north and the south.
 "The north and the south agreed to actively promote cooperation and exchanges in various fields so as to give momentum to the atmosphere of reconciliation and unity and demonstrate at home and abroad the stamina of the Korean nation.
 "The north and the south shared the view to make the Korean peninsula a peace zone free from nuclear weapons and nuclear threat and ensure necessary practical advance early to this end.
 "Chairman of the State Affairs Commission Kim Jong-un agreed to visit Seoul in the near future at the invitation of President Moon Jae In."

Internationally 
A unified Korean team marched in the opening ceremonies of the 2000, 2004, and 2006 Olympics, but the North and South Korean national teams competed separately. There were plans for a truly unified team at the 2008 Summer Olympics, but the two countries were unable to agree on the details of its implementation. In the 1991 World Table Tennis Championships in Chiba, Japan, the two countries formed a unified team. A Unified Korea women's ice hockey team competed under a separate IOC country code designation (COR) in the 2018 Winter Olympics; in all other sports, there were a separate North Korea team and a separate South Korea team.

Current status
The nature of unification, i.e. through North Korean collapse, South Korean collapse, or the formation of two systems under a united federation, is still a topic of intense political debate and even conflict among interested parties, which include both Koreas, China, Japan, Russia, and the United States.

Relations between the two Koreas have been strained in recent years, with conflict between the two coming to a head such as in the enforcement of the colonial era National Security Law in South Korea which lead to the arrest of South Korean pro-reunification activist Ro Su-hui, suspected torpedoing of the ROKS Cheonan and the bombardment of Yeonpyeong Island, both in 2010, the rocket launches in April and December of 2012 and North Korea's third nuclear test in 2013. Kim Jong-un's sudden accession and limited experience governing have also stoked fears about power struggles among different factions leading to future instability on the Korean Peninsula. 

Reunification remains a long-term goal for the governments of both North and South Korea. North Korean leader Kim Jong-un made calls in his 2012 New Year's Day speech to "remove confrontation" between the two countries and implement previous joint agreements for increased economic and political cooperation. The South Korean Ministry of Unification redoubled their efforts in 2011 and 2012 to raise awareness of the issue, launching a variety show (Miracle Audition) and an Internet sitcom with pro-unification themes. The Ministry already promotes curriculum in elementary schooling, such as a government-issued textbook about North Korea titled "We Are One" and reunification-themed arts and crafts projects.

In Kim's 2018 New Year's address, a Korean-led reunification was repeatedly mentioned and an unexpected proposal was made for the North's participation in the 2018 Winter Olympics that were held in Pyeongchang County of South Korea, a significant shift after several years of increasing hostilities.  Subsequent meetings between North and South led to the announcement that the two Koreas would march together with a unified flag in the Olympics' Opening Ceremony and form a unified ice hockey team, with a total of 22 North Korean athletes participating in various other competitions including figure skating, short track speed skating, cross-country skiing and alpine skiing.

In April 2018, at a summit in Panmunjom, Kim Jong-un and Moon Jae-in signed a deal committing to finally seal peace between both Koreas by the end of the year. Both leaders also symbolically crossed each other's borders, marking it the first time a South Korean president crossed the North border and vice versa. Kim stated that the North will start a process of denuclearization, which was supported by then U.S. President Donald Trump. The peace talks led to nothing, as North Korea continued forward with their nuclear program, despite former U.S. President Donald Trump boasting it as a considerable win.

Opposition
Support for reunification in South Korea has been falling, especially among the younger generations. In the 1990s, the percent of people in government polls who regarded reunification as essential was over 80%. By 2011 that number had dropped to 56%.

According to a December 2017 survey released by the Korea Institute for National Unification, 72.1% of South Koreans in their 20s believe reunification is unnecessary, with younger South Koreans saying they are more worried about issues related to their economy, employment, and living costs.

Polls show a majority of South Koreans, even those in age groups traditionally seen as being more eager to reunify the peninsula, are not willing to see their living conditions decline in order to accommodate a reunification with the North. Moreover, about 50% of men in their 20s see North Korea as an outright enemy that they want nothing to do with.

Some scholars, like Paul Roderick Gregory, have suggested that a complete abandonment of Korean reunification may be necessary, in exchange for the North to dismantle its nuclear weapons program and permanently ending the Korean War with a peace treaty.

Strategies

Sunshine Policy

Introduced by the Millennium Democratic Party of South Korea under President Kim Dae-jung, as part of a campaign pledge to "actively pursue reconciliation and cooperation" with North Korea, the Sunshine Policy was intended to create conditions of economic assistance and cooperation for reunification, rather than sanctions and military threats. The plan was divided into three parts: increased cooperation through inter-Korean organizations (while maintaining separate systems in the North and South), national unification with two autonomous regional governments, and finally the creation of a central national government. In 1998, Kim approved large shipments of food aid to the North Korean government, lifted limits on business deals between North Korean and South Korean firms, and even called for a stop to the American economic embargo against the North. In June 2000, the leaders of North and South Korea met in Pyongyang and shook hands for the first time since the division of Korea.

Despite the continuation of the Sunshine Policy under the Roh administration, it was eventually declared a failure by the South Korean Ministry of Unification in November 2010 over issues of North Korea's nuclear weapons program, stymied further negotiations, and again strained relations between the two Koreas.

Opponents
Opponents of the Sunshine Policy argue that dialogue and trade with North Korea did nothing to improve prospects for peaceful reunification, despite the transfer of large funds to the North Korean government by President Kim Dae-jung, but allowed the North Korean government to retain its hold on power. Others believe that South Korea should remain prepared for the event of a North Korean attack. Hardliners also argue that the continued and maximized isolation of the North will lead to the country's collapse after which the territory could be absorbed by force into the Republic of Korea.

In November 2000, outgoing US President Bill Clinton wanted to visit Pyongyang. However, the intended visit never happened because the controversy surrounding the results of the 2000 US presidential election. Around April or May 2001, Kim Dae-jung was expecting to welcome Kim Jong-il to Seoul. Returning from his meeting in Washington D.C. with newly elected President Bush, Kim Dae-jung described his meeting as embarrassing while privately cursing President Bush and his hardliner approach. This meeting negated any chance of a North Korean visit to South Korea. After the Bush administration labeling North Korea as being part of the "axis of evil", North Korea renounced the nonproliferation treaty, kicked out UN inspectors, and restarted its nuclear program. In early 2005, the North Korean government confirmed that the country had successfully become a nuclear armed state.

The Three Charters for National Reunification 
In North Korea, the Three Charters for National Reunification serve as the sole guidelines for reunification. They were formulated by North Korean leader Kim Jong-il into the Three Charters for National Reunification in his public work "Let Us Carry Out the Great Comrade’s Instructions for National Reunification”, in 1997.

Three Principles for National Reunification 
North Korean President Kim Il-sung proposed the Three Principles of National Reunification in 1972 as the central force that should drive reunification. They are as follows:

 "National reunification should be achieved independently without reliance on outside forces and free from their interference.
 "Great national unity should be promoted by transcending the differences in ideas, deals and systems.
 "National reunification should be achieved by peaceful means without resorting to arms."

Ten Point Programme for Reunification of the Country 
The Ten Point Programme for Reunification of the Country was written by Kim Il-sung in 1993 and contains the idea of reunification with South Korea under a pan-national unified state. It emphasises once again the need for an independent reunification, and more specifically, the removal of US forces from the peninsula. It is laid out as follows:

 "A unified state, independent, peaceful and neutral, should be founded through the great unity of the whole nation.
 "Unity should be based on patriotism and the spirit of national independence.
 "Unity should be achieved on the principle of promotion coexistence, coprosperity and common interests and subordinating everything to the cause of national reunification.
 "All manner of political disputes that foment division and confrontation between the fellow countrymen should be stopped and unity be achieved.
 "They should dispel fears of invasion from the south and from the north, prevail-over-communism and communization altogether and believe in and unite with each other.
 "They should set store by democracy and join hands on the road to national reunification, not rejecting each other for the difference in isms and principles.
 "They should protect material and spiritual wealth of individual persons and organizations and encourage them to be used favorably for the promotion of great national unity.
 "The whole nation should understand, trust and unite with one another through contacts, travels and dialogues.
 "The whole nation in the north and the south and overseas should strengthen solidarity with one another on the way to national reunification.
 "Those who have contributed to the great unity of the nation and to the cause of national reunification should be highly estimated."

Plan for founding the Democratic Confederal Republic of Koryo 
In accordance with the three principles and the ten point programme, Kim Il-sung elaborated on the proposed state, called Democratic Confederal Republic of Koryo (DFRK), on October 10, 1980, in the Report to the Sixth Congress of the Workers' Party of Korea on the Work of the Central Committee. Kim proposed a confederation between North and South Korea, in which their respective political systems would initially remain. It is described by North Korea as a "...peaceful reunification proposal to found a federal state on the condition that the north and the south recognize and tolerate each other’s existing ideologies." It was stated that the DFRK should be a neutral country which does not participate in any political, military alliance or bloc, embracing the whole of the territory and people of the country.

Reunification tax 
On January 1, 2011, a group of twelve lawmakers from the ruling and opposition parties introduced a bill into the South Korean National Assembly to allow for the establishment of a "unification tax". The bill called for businesses to pay 0.05% of corporate tax, individuals to pay 5% of inheritance or gift taxes, and both individuals and companies to pay 2% of their income tax towards the cost of unification. The bill initiated legislative debate on practical measures to prepare for unification, as proposed by President Lee Myung-bak in his Liberation Day speech the previous year. The proposal for a unification tax was not warmly welcomed at the time. Lee has since reiterated concerns regarding the imminence of unification, which, combined with North Korean behavior, led to the tax proposal gaining wider acceptance. Practical measures to prepare for unification are becoming an increasingly frequent aspect of political debate, as concern regarding imminent and abrupt unification increases.

Korean Economic Community
It has been suggested that the formation of a Korean Economic Community could be a way to ease in unification of the peninsula. Lee Myung-bak, departing from the Saenuri Party's traditional hardline stance, outlined a comprehensive diplomatic package on North Korea that includes setting up a consultative body to discuss economic projects between the two Koreas. He proposed seeking a Korean economic community agreement to provide the legal and systemic basis for any projects agreed to in the body.

Reunification Investment Fund
Former Inha University professor Shepherd Iverson has proposed creating a $175 billion reunification investment fund aiming to bribe the elite officials on top of DPRK's hierarchy to ensure a diplomatic way to resolve the Korean conflict by conducting an internal regime change. In the proposal a sum of up to $23.3 billion would be paid in total to the families of those elite officials who wield power in Pyongyang, while he noted that the top ten families would receive $30 million each, and the top thousand families would get $5 million. Another sum of $121.8 billion would go to the country’s general population to start their life again post-reunification, and it's envisioned that the proceeds for the fund is to be raised from private groups and business moguls.

Comparisons

The hypothetical reunification of Korea is often compared to other countries which had divided governments and reunified, including Germany and Vietnam. Like the Koreas, each of these divided countries had a USSR/Warsaw Pact or China aligned communist government and a US/NATO-aligned capitalist government. Germany had the communist German Democratic Republic in East Germany and the capitalist Federal Republic of Germany in West Germany, and Vietnam had the communist Democratic Republic of Vietnam in North Vietnam and the capitalist State of Vietnam-Republic of Vietnam-Republic of South Vietnam in South Vietnam from 1954 to 1976.

Germany (1945–1990)

While the situation of South and North Korea might seem comparable to East and West Germany, another country divided by Cold War politics, there are some notable differences. Germany did not have a civil war that resulted in millions of casualties, meaning "it is very hard to believe that People's Army commanders who fought the South in such a bloody fratricidal war would allow the ROK to overwhelm the DPRK, by whatever means". Both sides of Germany maintained a working relationship after World War II, but the two Koreas' relationship has been more acrimonious.

The East Germans also had 360,000 Soviet troops on their soil in 1989; however, North Korea has not had any foreign troops on its soil since 1958. "East Germany collapsed because [Soviet general secretary Mikhail] Gorbachev chose to do what none of his predecessors would ever have done, namely, to keep Soviet troops in their barracks rather than mobilize them to save the Honecker regime." The East Germans looked favorably at the fact that West Germans had good retirement benefits, public order and strong civil society, whereas North Korean citizens are not aware of any immediate benefits from uniting with South Korea, because all such knowledge is kept from them by the state.

Under Roh Tae-woo, a former South Korean army general and politician, the Seoul government created a "Nordpolitik" policy, based on the West German "Ostpolitik" model, hoping to make trading agreements with Pyongyang.

Culture
The cultures of the two halves have separated following partition, even though traditional Korean culture and history are shared. In addition, many families were split by the division of Korea. In the practically comparable situation of the German reunification, the 41-year-long separation has left significant impacts on German culture and society, even after three decades. Given the extreme differences of North and South Korean culture and lifestyle, the effects might last even longer. Many experts have suggested that the differences between "Westerners" and "Easterners" will gradually dissipate among younger generations, born after reunification and with increasing migration between eastern and western Germany. Therefore, it is highly likely that Korean youth will play a major role in the cultural integration after a hypothetical Korean reunification.

On the other hand, the North Korean population is far more culturally distinct and isolated than the East German population was in the late 1980s. Unlike in East Germany, North Koreans generally cannot receive foreign broadcasting or read foreign publications. Germany was divided for 44 years and did not have border clashes between the two sides. By comparison, the Koreas have been divided for over 70 years, and hostilities have flared frequently over the years, becoming more frequent since the ascension of Kim Jong-un as the supreme leader of North Korea. The Korean ethnic nationalist belief that unification is a "sacred, universally-desired" goal to recover an ethnic homogeneity (dongjilseong) obscures North-South differences developed since 1945, and risks intolerance for the cultural accommodation necessary for a unified Korean polity.

Economy

Korean reunification would differ from the German reunification precedent. In relative terms, North Korea's economy is currently in a far worse situation than that of East Germany in 1990. The income per capita ratio (PPP) was about 3:1 in Germany (US$25,000 for the West versus about US$8,500 for the East). The ratio is around 22:1 in Korea (in 2015: US$37,600 for the South, US$1,700 for the North). While at the moment of German reunification the East German population (around 17 million) was about a third of West Germany's (more than 60 million), the North Korean population (around 25 million) is currently around half of South Korea's (around 51 million). In the event of Korean reunification, a flood of North Koreans to a much more developed South Korea may cause the country's economy to undergo a heavy burden that will cost upwards of US$1 trillion, possibly creating a period of economic collapse or stagnation.

In September 2009, Goldman Sachs published its 188th Global Economics Paper named A United Korea? which highlighted in detail the potential economic power of a unified Korea, which would surpass many G7 countries, including Canada, Germany, France, Italy, the United Kingdom and possibly Japan within 30–40 years of reunification, with a potential GDP of more than $6 trillion by 2050. The young, skilled labor and large amount of natural resources from the North combined with the advanced technology, infrastructure and large amount of capital in the South, as well as Korea's strategic location connecting three major economic powers, were cited as potential factors that could drive this growth. According to some opinions, a unified Korea could occur before 2050. If it occurred, Korean reunification would immediately raise the country's population to over 80 million. According to research by Jin-Wook Kim at Citi, reunification would require an investment of US$63.1 billion in the long term to rebuild transportation such as railroads, roads, airports, sea ports and other infrastructure like power plants, mines, oil refineries, and gas pipelines.

Vietnam (1954–1976)

The division between North and South Korea can be seen as more comparable to North and South Vietnam, which were also divided after independence following World War II from a colonial power (France), and after occupation by Japan. Unlike the Korean War, the Vietnam War spanned a much longer period and spilled over to the neighboring countries of Laos and Cambodia. The end of the war resulted in all three countries coming under control of the Communist-oriented independence movements 1976, with China and the Soviet Union competing for influence. Relations between North and South Vietnam were also acrimonious, with North Vietnam being largely isolated and unrecognized except by other communist states, similarly to North Korea.

Culture
Similarly to both Germany and Korea, the separation of North and South Vietnam has also left significant cultural differences that continue today. Furthermore, cultural differences between the two parts of Vietnam had also existed prior to the partition of the country.

International status

People's Republic of China
In 1984, the Beijing Review provided the PRC's view on Korean unification: "With regard to the situation on the Korean peninsula, China's position is clear: it is squarely behind the proposal of the Democratic People's Republic of Korea for tripartite (between the two Koreas and the United States) talks to seek a peaceful and independent reunification of Korea in the form of a confederation, free from outside interference. China believes this is the surest way to reduce tension on the peninsula."

The PRC's current relationship with North Korea and position on a unified Korea is seen as dependent on a number of issues. A unified Korea could prevent North Korea's nuclear weapons program from destabilizing East Asia as well as the PRC government. The 2010 United States diplomatic cables leak mentioned two unnamed PRC officials telling the Deputy Foreign Minister of South Korea that the younger generation of PRC leaders increasingly believed that Korea should be reunified under South Korean rule, provided it were not hostile to PRC. The report also claimed that senior officials and the general public in the PRC were becoming increasingly frustrated with the North acting like a "spoiled child," following its repeated missile and nuclear tests, which were seen as a gesture of defiance not only to the West, but also to the PRC. The business magazine Caixin reported that North Korea accounted for 40% of PRC's foreign aid budget and required 50,000 tonnes of oil per month as a buffer state against Japan, South Korea, and the United States, with whom trade and investment is now worth billions. North Korea is seen in the PRC as expensive and internationally embarrassing to support.

However, the collapse of the North Korean regime and unification by Seoul would also present a number of problems for PRC. A sudden and violent collapse might cause a mass exodus of North Koreans fleeing or fighting poverty into PRC, causing a humanitarian crisis that could destabilize northeast PRC. The movement of South Korean and American soldiers into the North could result in their being temporarily or even permanently stationed on PRC's border, seen as a potential threat to PRC sovereignty and an imposition of a PRC containment policy. A unified Korea could also more strongly pursue its territorial disputes with PRC and might inflame nationalism among Koreans in PRC. Some have claimed the existence of contingency plans for PRC intervening in situations of great turmoil in North Korea (with the Chinese Academy of Social Sciences' Northeast Project on the Chinese identity of the Goguryeo kingdom potentially used to justify intervention or even annexation).

Soviet Union and Russia

As relations between North Korea and the Soviet Union warmed, the latter returned to warm public support for Kim Il-Sung's peaceful reunification proposals. Soviet attention in Northeast Asia gradually began to focus on a new plan for "collective security in Asia" first proposed in an Izvestia editorial in May 1969 and mentioned specifically by Soviet general secretary Leonid Brezhnev in his address to the International Conference of Communist and Workers' Parties in Moscow the following month:

United States

The United States officially supports Korean reunification under a democratic government. Mike Mansfield proposed that Korea be neutralized under a great-power agreement, accompanied by the withdrawal of all foreign troops and the discontinuation of security treaties with the great power guarantors of the North and South.

In the 1990s, despite issues surrounding the controversial US-South Korean joint Team Spirit military exercises, the Clinton administration still managed to help turn around the situation regarding peace with North Korea through Jimmy Carter's support. It promised light water reactors in exchange for the availability of North Korea for inspection of its facilities and other concessions. North Korea reacted positively, despite blaming the United States as the original aggressor in the Korean War. There were attempts to normalize relations with Japan as well as the United States with South Korean President Kim Dae-jung in open support. North Korea actually favored the United States military's position on the front lines because it helped prevent an outbreak of war. Eventually, aid and oil were supplied, and even cooperation with South Korean business firms. However, one of the remaining fears was North Korea, with their necessary uranium deposits, having the potential to achieve a high level of nuclear technology.

Former US Secretary of State Henry Kissinger, another supporter of Korean unification, proposed a six-party conference to find a way out of the Korean dilemma, composed of the two Koreas and four connected powers (the United States, the Soviet Union, China, and Japan). North Korea denounced the "four plus two" scenario, as it was also known, by claiming Korea would be at the mercy of the great powers and insinuated the reestablishment of Japanese power in Korea. However, North Korea ultimately lacked confidence in getting simultaneous help from China and the Soviet Union.

United Nations
Following a summit meeting in Pyongyang on June 13–15, 2000 between leaders of the two countries, the chairpersons of the Millennium Summit issued a statement welcoming their Joint Declaration as a breakthrough in bringing peace, stability, and reunification to the Korean peninsula. Seven weeks later, a resolution to the same effect was passed by the United Nations General Assembly after being co-sponsored by 150 other nations.

A scheduled General Assembly debate on the topic in 2002 was deferred for a year at the request of both nations, and when the subject returned in 2003, it was immediately dropped off the agenda.

The issue did not return to the General Assembly until 2007, following a second Inter-Korean summit held in Pyongyang on October 2–4, 2007. These talks were held during one round of the Six-Party Talks in Beijing which committed to the denuclearization of the Korean peninsula.

Implications
A unified Korea could have great implications for the balance of power in the region, with South Korea already considered by many a regional power. Reunification would give access to cheap labor and abundant natural resources in the North, which, combined with existing technology and capital in the South, would create large economic and military growth potential. According to a 2009 study by Goldman Sachs, a unified Korea could have an economy larger than that of Japan by 2050. A unified Korean military would have the largest number of military reservists as well as one of the largest numbers of military hackers.

Note

See also

 2018 North Korea–United States Singapore Summit
 2019 North Korea–United States Hanoi Summit
 2019 Koreas–United States DMZ Summit
 23880 Tongil (asteroid honoring reunification process)
 Peace Treaty on Korean Peninsula
 Inter-Korean summits
 Seoul–Pyongyang hotline
 Korean conflict
 Division of Korea
 Korean Armistice Agreement
 North Korea–South Korea relations
 North Korea and weapons of mass destruction
 OPLAN 5027 and OPLAN 5029
 Panmunjom Declaration
 Korean peace process
 List of international trips made by Kim Jong-un

Related
 Chinese unification
 One country, two systems
 German reunification, 1990
 Unification of Moldova and Romania
 United Ireland
 Indian reunification

References

Sources

External links

 Ministry of Unification (South Korea)

Politics of North Korea
Politics of South Korea
National unifications
Proposed political unions
North Korea–South Korea relations
Aftermath of the Korean War
Korean irredentism
Government of North Korea
Government of South Korea
reunification
Territorial disputes of North Korea
Territorial disputes of South Korea
Military history of Korea
Public policy proposals